The 1998 Vuelta a España was the 53rd edition of the Vuelta a España, one of cycling's Grand Tours. The Vuelta began in Córdoba on 5 September, and Stage 12 occurred on 17 September with a stage from Benasque. The race finished in Madrid on 27 September.

Stage 12
17 September 1998 — Benasque to Jaca,

Stage 13
18 September 1998 — Sabiñánigo to Sabiñánigo,

Stage 14
19 September 1998 — Biescas to Zaragoza,

Stage 15
20 September 1998 — Zaragoza to Soria,

Stage 16

Stage 17
22 September 1998 — Burgos to León,

Stage 18
23 September 1998 — León to Salamanca,

Stage 19
24 September 1998 — Ávila to Segovia,

Stage 20
25 September 1998 — Segovia to Alto de Navacerrada,

Stage 21
26 September 1998 — Fuenlabrada to Fuenlabrada,  (ITT)

Stage 22
27 September 1998 — Madrid to Madrid,

References

1998 Vuelta a España
Vuelta a España stages